This is a list of reptile species found in the Kerala, India.

Order: Crocodilia (crocodilians)

Suborder: Eusuchia

Family: Crocodylidae (crocodiles)

Genus: Crocodylus

Crocodylus porosus (saltwater crocodile / കായൽ മുതല)

Crocodylus palustris (mugger crocodile / മഗ്ഗർ മുതല)

Order: Testudines (turtles)

Suborder: Cryptodira

Family: Geoemydidae (pond, river and wood turtles)

Genus: Melanochelys

Melanochelys trijuga (Indian black turtle / കാരാമ)

Genus: Vijayachelys

Vijayachelys silvatica (Cochin forest cane turtle / ചൂരലാമ)

Family: Cheloniidae (sea turtles)

Genus: Chelonia

Chelonia mydas (green sea turtle / പച്ചക്കടലാമ)

Genus: Eretmochelys

Eretmochelys imbricata (hawksbill sea turtle / ചുണ്ടൻ കടലാമ)

Genus: Lepidochelys

Lepidochelys olivacea (olive ridley sea turtle / ഒലീവ് റിഡ്‌ലി കടലാമ)

Family: Dermochelyidae (leatherback turtles)

Genus: Dermochelys

Dermochelys coriacea (leatherback sea turtle / തോൽപ്പുറകൻ കടലാമ)

Family: Testudinidae (tortoises)

Genus: Geochelone

Geochelone elegans (Indian star tortoise / ഇന്ത്യൻ നക്ഷത്ര ആമ)

Genus: Indotestudo

Indotestudo travancorica (Travancore tortoise / കാട്ടാമ)

Family: Trionychidae (softshell turtles)

Genus: Nilssonia

Nilssonia leithii (Leith's softshell turtle)

Genus: Lissemys

Lissemys punctata (Indian flapshell turtle / വെള്ളാമ)

Genus: Pelochelys

Pelochelys cantorii (Cantor's giant softshell turtle / ഭീമനാമ)

Genus: Chitra

Chitra indica (Indian narrow-headed softshell turtle / ചിത്രയാമ)

Order: Squamata (scaled reptiles)

Suborder: Iguania

Family: Agamidae (lizards)

Genus: Calotes

Calotes calotes (common green forest lizard / പച്ചയോന്ത്)

Calotes grandisquamis (large-scaled forest lizard / കാട്ടുപച്ചയോന്ത്)

Calotes nemoricola (Nilgiri forest lizard / നീലഗിരി ഓന്ത്)

Calotes versicolor (oriental garden lizard / ഓറിയന്റൽ ഗാർഡൻ ലിസാർഡ്)

Genus: Monilesaurus

Monilesaurus ellioti (Elliot's forest lizard / മുള്ളോന്ത്)

Monilesaurus rouxii (Roux's forest lizard)

Genus: Draco

Draco dussumieri (southern flying lizard / പറയോന്ത്)

Genus: Otocryptis

Otocryptis beddomei (Indian kangaroo lizard / കങ്കാരു ഓന്ത്)

Genus: Psammophilus

Psammophilus blanfordanus (Blanford's rock agama / കൂനൻ പാറയോന്ത്)

Psammophilus dorsalis (peninsular rock agama / പാറയോന്ത്)

Genus: Salea

Salea anamallayana (Anaimalai spiny lizard / ആനമലയോന്ത്)

Salea horsfieldii (Horsfield's spiny lizard / നീലഗിരി മലയോന്ത്)

Genus: Sitana

Sitana ponticeriana (fan-throated lizard / ചങ്കനോന്ത്)

Family: Chamaeleonidae (chameleons)

Genus: Chamaeleo

Chamaeleo zeylanicus (Indian chameleon / മരയോന്ത്)

Family: Gekkonidae (geckoes)

Genus: Cnemaspis

Cnemaspis beddomei (Beddome's day gecko)

Cnemaspis gracilis (slender day gecko/ പൊന്നൻമരപ്പല്ലി)

Cnemaspis indica (Indian day gecko / ഇന്ത്യൻ മരപ്പല്ലി)

Cnemaspis kottiyoorensis (Kottiyoor day gecko)

Cnemaspis littoralis (coastal day gecko)

Cnemaspis monticola (mountain day gecko)

Cnemaspis nairi (Ponmudi day gecko)

Cnemaspis nilagirica (Nilgiri day gecko)

Cnemaspis ornata (ornate day gecko)

Cnemaspis sisparensis (Sispara day gecko)

Cnemaspis wynadensis (Wyanad day gecko)

Genus: Geckoella

Geckoella collegalensis (Kollegal ground gecko)

Genus: Gehyra

Gehyra mutilata (four-clawed gecko)

Genus: Hemidactylus

Hemidactylus anamallensis (Anaimalai gecko)

Hemidactylus brookii (Brooke's house gecko)

Hemidactylus frenatus (common house gecko)

Hemidactylus leschenaultii (Leschenault's leaf-toed gecko)

Hemidactylus maculatus (spotted leaf-toed gecko)

Hemidactylus prashadi (Bombay leaf-toed gecko)

Hemidactylus reticulatus (reticulate leaf-toed gecko)

Hemidactylus triedrus (termite hill gecko)

Family: Lacertidae (lacertas)

Genus: Ophisops

Ophisops beddomei (Beddome's snake-eye/lacerta)

Ophisops leschenaultii (Leschenault's snake-eye/lacerta)

Family: Scincidae (skinks)

Genus: Chalcides

Chalcides pentadactylus (five-fingered skink)

Genus: Dasia

Dasia subcaeruleum (Boulenger's tree skink)

Genus: Eutropis

Eutropis beddomii (Beddome's skink)

Eutropis bibronii (Bibron's seashore skink)

Eutropis carinata (golden skink / അരണ)

Eutropis clivicola (mountain/Inger's skink)

Eutropis macularia (bronze grass skink)

Genus: Kaestlea/Scincella

Kaestlea beddomii (Beddome's ground skink)

Kaestlea bilineata (two-lined ground skink)

Kaestlea laterimaculata (side-spotted ground skink)

Kaestlea palnica (Palni ground skink)

Kaestlea travancorica (Travancore ground skink)

Genus: Riopa

Riopa albopunctata (white-spotted supple skink / വെൺപൊട്ടൻ പാമ്പരണ)

Genus: Lygosoma

Lygosoma punctata (white-spotted supple skink / പാമ്പരണ)

Genus: Ristella

Ristella beddomii (Beddome's cat skink)

Ristella guentheri (Günther's cat skink)

Ristella rurkii (Rurk's cat skink)

Ristella travancorica (Travancore cat skink)

Genus: Sphenomorphus

Sphenomorphus dussumieri (Dussumier's forest skink / കാട്ടരണ)

Family: Varanidae (monitor lizards)

Genus: Varanus

Varanus bengalensis (Bengal/Indian monitor / ഉടുമ്പ്)

Suborder: Serpentes

Family: Acrochordidae (file snakes)

Genus: Acrochordus

Acrochordus granulatus (marine file snake / കായൽ പാമ്പ്)

Family: Colubridae (colubrid snakes)

Genus: Ahaetulla

Ahaetulla dispar (Gunther's vine snake / മലമ്പച്ചോലൻ പാമ്പ്)

Ahaetulla nasuta (green vine snake / പച്ചിലപാമ്പ്‌)

Ahaetulla perroteti (Western Ghats bronzeback / ചോലപ്പച്ചോലൻ‍)

Ahaetulla pulverulenta (brown vine snake / തവിട്ടോലപ്പാമ്പ്)

Genus: Argyrogena

Argyrogena fasciolata (banded racer / വള്ളിച്ചേര)

Genus: Boiga

Boiga beddomei (Beddome's cat snake)

Boiga ceylonensis (Sri Lanka cat snake / കാട്ടുവലയൻ പാമ്പ്)

Boiga dightoni (Pirmad cat snake / പീരുമേടൻ പാമ്പ്)

Boiga forsteni (Forsten's cat snake / കരികുരിയൻ പാമ്പ്)

Boiga nuchalis (collared cat snake / വളയൻ പൂച്ചക്കണ്ണിപ്പാമ്പ്)

Boiga trigonata (common cat snake / പൂച്ചക്കണ്ണൻ)

Genus: Chrysopelea

Chrysopelea ornata (golden tree snake / നാഗത്താൻപാമ്പ്)

Genus: Coelognathus

Coelognathus helena (trinket snake / കാട്ടുപാമ്പ്)

Genus: Dendrelaphis

Dendrelaphis ashoki (Ashok's bronzeback / വരയൻ വില്ലൂന്നി)

Dendrelaphis chairecaeos/chairecacos (southern bronzeback / നൽവരയൻകൊംബെരി പാമ്പ്)

Dendrelaphis girii (Giri's bronzeback / കാട്ടുകൊംബെരി പാമ്പ്)

Dendrelaphis grandoculis (large-eyed bronzeback / മലകൊംബെരി പാമ്പ്)

Dendrelaphis tristis (common bronzeback / വില്ലൂന്നി)

Genus: Liopeltis

Liopeltis calamaria (calamaria reed snake / ചെന്നിവരയൻ പാമ്പ്)

Genus: Lycodon

Lycodon aulicus (Indian wolf snake / വെള്ളിവരയൻ പാമ്പ്)

Lycodon nympha (bridal snake)

Lycodon striatus (barred wolf snake / വരവരയൻ പാമ്പ്)

Lycodon travancoricus (Travancore wolf snake / തിരുവിതാംകൂർ വെള്ളിവരയൻ‍)

Genus: Oligodon

Oligodon affinis (western kukri / മലഞ്ചുരുട്ട)

Oligodon arnensis (banded kukri / വരയൻ ചുരുട്ട)

Oligodon brevicauda (shorthead kukri / കുട്ടിവാലൻ ചുരുട്ട)

Oligodon taeniolatus (streaked kukri)

Oligodon travancoricus (Travancore kukri / തെക്കൻ ചുരുട്ട)

Oligodon venustus (Jerdon's kukri / ഒരച്ചുരുട്ട)

Genus: Ptyas

Ptyas mucosa (Indian rat snake / ചേര)

Genus: Rhabdops

Rhabdops olivaceus (olive forest snake / മോന്തയുന്തി പാമ്പ്)

Genus: Sibynophis

Sibynophis subpunctatus (Duméril's black-headed snake / എഴുത്താണി ചുരുട്ട)

Family: Erycidae/Erycinae (sand boas)

Genus: Eryx

Eryx conicus (Russell's boa / ഇരുതലൻ മണ്ണൂലി)

Eryx johnii (Indian sand boa / വലിയ മണ്ണൂലി)

Eryx whitakeri (Whitaker's sand boa)

Family: Elapidae (elapid snakes)

Genus: Bungarus

Bungarus caeruleus (common krait / വെള്ളിക്കെട്ടൻ)

Genus: Calliophis

Calliophis beddomei (Beddome's coral snake)

Calliophis bibroni (Bibron's coral snake / എഴുത്താണി വളയൻ)

Calliophis melanurus (Indian coral snake / എഴുത്താണി മൂർഖൻ)

Calliophis nigrescens (black coral snake / ഇരുളൻ പവിഴപ്പാമ്പ്)

Genus: Hydrophis

Hydrophis curtus (short sea snake)

Hydrophis cyanocinctus (annulated sea snake / നീലവരയൻ)

Hydrophis ornatus (ornate reef sea snake / ചിറ്റുളിപ്പാമ്പ്)

Hydrophis platurus (yellow-bellied sea snake / മഞ്ഞക്കറുപ്പൻ പാമ്പ്)

Hydrophis schistosus (hook-nosed sea snake / വലകടിയൻ കടൽപാമ്പ്)

Genus: Naja

Naja naja (Indian cobra / ഇന്ത്യൻ മൂർഖൻ)

Genus: Ophiophagus

Ophiophagus hannah (king cobra / രാജവെമ്പാല)

Family: Gerrhopilidae (worm snakes)

Genus: Gerrhopilus/Typhlops

Gerrhopilus beddomii (Beddome's worm snake)

Gerrhopilus thurstoni (Thurston's worm snake / അമ്മിഞ്ഞിക്കുടിയൻ പാമ്പ്)

Gerrhopilus tindalli (Tindall's worm snake)

Family: Homalopsidae (mud snakes)

Genus: Cerberus

Cerberus rynchops (dog-faced water snake / ആറ്റുവായ്പ്പാമ്പ്)

Genus: Dieurostus

Dieurostus dussumierii (Dussumier's water snake / ചെളിക്കൂട)

Genus: Gerarda

Gerarda prevostiana (Gerard's water snake / പച്ചാറ്റുവായ്പ്പാമ്പ്)

Family: Natricidae/Natricinae (Keelbacks)

Genus: Atretium

Atretium schistosum (split keelback / പച്ചനീർമണ്ഡലി)

Genus: Amphiesma

Amphiesma stolatum (buff striped keelback / തെയ്യാൻ പാമ്പ്)

Genus: Hebius

Hebius beddomei (Nilgiri keelback)

Amphiesma monticola (hill keelback / കാട്ടുനീർക്കോലി)

Genus: Rhabdophis

Rhabdophis plumbicolor (green keelback / പച്ചനാഗം)

Genus: Fowlea

Fowlea piscator (checkered keelback / നീർക്കോലി)

Family: Pythonidae (pythons)

Genus: Python

Python molurus (Indian python / മലമ്പാമ്പ്)

Family: Typhlopidae (blind snakes)

Genus: Grypotyphlops

Grypotyphlops acutus (beak-nosed blind snake)

Genus: Indotyphlops

Indotyphlops braminus (brahminy blind snake)

Family: Uropeltidae (shieldtails)

Genus: Teretrurus

Teretrurus rhodogaster (Wall's shield tail)

Genus: Melanophidium

Melanophidium bilineatum (two-lined black shieldtail)

Melanophidium punctatum (Beddome's black shieldtail)

Melanophidium wynaudense (Indian black earth snake)

Genus: Platyplectrurus

Platyplectrurus madurensis (Travancore Hills thorntail)

Platyplectrurus trilineatus (lined thorntail)

Genus: Plectrurus

Plectrurus aureus (Kerala burrowing snake)

Plectrurus guentheri (Günther's burrowing snake)

Plectrurus perrotetii (Nilgiri burrowing snake)

Genus: Rhinophis

Rhinophis fergusonianus (Cardamom Hills earth snake)

Rhinophis sanguineus (red-bellied shieldtail)

Rhinophis travancoricus (Travancore shieldtail)

Genus: Teretrurus

Teretrurus sanguineus (purple-red earth snake)

Genus: Uropeltis

Uropeltis arcticeps (Thirunelveli earth snake)

Uropeltis beddomii (Beddome's earth snake)

Uropeltis ceylanica (Kerala shieldtail)

Uropeltis ellioti (Elliot's earth snake)

Uropeltis grandis (violet shieldtail)

Uropeltis liura (Günther's earth snake)

Uropeltis macrorhyncha (Anaimalai earth snake)

Uropeltis maculata (spotted earth snake)

Uropeltis myhendrae (Boulenger's earth snake)

Uropeltis nitida (southern earth snake)

Uropeltis ocellata (Nilgiri shieldtail)

Uropeltis petersi (Peter's shieldtail)

Uropeltis pulneyensis (Palni shieldtail / പഴനിപ്പാമ്പ്)

Uropeltis rubrolineata (red-lined shieldtail / കുങ്കുമവരയൻ പാമ്പ്)

Uropeltis rubromaculata/rubromaculatus (red-spotted shieldtail / കുങ്കുമപ്പൊട്ടൻ പാമ്പ്)

Uropeltis woodmasoni (Wood-Mason's earth snake / കരടിയിരുതലയൻ പാമ്പ്)

Family: Viperidae (vipers)

Genus: Daboia

Daboia russelii (Russell's viper / അണലി)

Genus: Echis

Echis carinatus (saw-scaled viper / ചുരുട്ടമണ്ഡലി)

Genus: Hypnale

Hypnale hypnale (hump-nosed viper / മുഴമൂക്കൻ കുഴിമണ്ഡലി)

Genus: Trimeresurus

Trimeresurus gramineus (bamboo pit viper / മുളമണ്ഡലി)

Trimeresurus macrolepis (large-scaled pit viper / ചട്ടിത്തലയൻ കുഴിമണ്ഡലി)

Trimeresurus malabaricus (Malabar pit viper / ചോലമണ്ഡലി)

Trimeresurus strigatus (horseshoe pit viper / ലാടമണ്ഡലി)

Family: Xenodermatidae (narrow-headed snakes)

Genus: Xylophis

Xylophis captaini (Captain's wood snake / കുഞ്ഞിത്തലയൻ പാമ്പ്)

Xylophis perroteti (Perrotet's mountain snake)

Xylophis stenorhynchus (Günther's mountain snake / ഒരക്കുള്ളൻ പാമ്പ്)

See also 

 Wildlife of Kerala
 List of Odonata of Kerala
 List of butterflies of Kerala
 List of amphibians of Kerala
 List of birds of Kerala
 List of mammals of Kerala

References
 Palot, M. J. (2015). "A checklist of reptiles of Kerala, India". Journal of Threatened Taxa. 7 (13): 8010–8022
 Indian snake checklist
 Daniel, J. C.(2002). The Book of Indian Reptiles and Amphibians. Bombay Natural History Society and Oxford University Press.

External links
 Reptile database
 Herpetology in South Asia

Reptiles
Reptiles
Kerala